C. Pennington "Penn" Brown is a Democratic former member of the New Hampshire House of Representatives, representing the Rockingham 9th District after a special election in February 2006.

External links
New Hampshire House of Representatives - Pennington Brown official NH House website
Project Vote Smart - Representative C. Pennington 'Penn' Brown (NH) profile
Follow the Money - Penn Brown
2006 2004 campaign contributions

Members of the New Hampshire House of Representatives
Living people
Year of birth missing (living people)
21st-century American politicians